Gigantic (A Tale of Two Johns) is a documentary profiling the alternative rock band They Might Be Giants, featuring interviews with Frank Black, Sarah Vowell, Dave Eggers, Mark Hoppus, and others.  It was directed by AJ Schnack and premiered at the South by Southwest Film Festival in 2002.  It was released in theaters by Cowboy Pictures, and on DVD by Plexifilm in 2003.  The DVD includes bonus features such as music videos, vintage live performances, and more.

External links
Gigantic (A Tale of Two Johns) on This Might Be a Wiki

 

2002 films
American independent films
Rockumentaries
They Might Be Giants
2000s English-language films
2000s American films